Michaela Rose is a German singer. She was an original member of the Arabesque disco group that started in 1977, and is the only original member still active in it. As of 2020, she continues to perform with the group, now known as "Arabesque featuring Michaela Rose".

Life and career

Rose was born in Switzerland to a German mother and an Uzbekistan father in 1958. Her last name "Rose", comes from her Mexican-American stepfather. When she was 14, she moved from Italy to Switzerland and later worked at a Veruschka boutique and as a model for several years.

Rose later moved to Germany and auditioned for the Young Star Records Starchance '75 contest — where the winner would get the chance to be a member of a new music group. Rose won the audition, signed a contract with the record company, and became a founding member of the Arabesque group, along with Karen Ann Tepperis and Mary Ann Nagel. Michaela Rose and Arabesque found great success from the very beginning with Hello Mr. Monkey and their 1978 Friday Night (Arabesque album). While often providing backing vocals for many of the Arabesque songs, Rose was in charge of the group's fashion, outfits, and costumes for performances. She toured extensively with Arabesque throughout Europe, Asia, and the Far East.

In 1984, Arabesque disbanded and she continued on with colleague Jasmin Vetter in the "Rouge" duo. Rouge had moderate success in the Japanese market. In 1989, Rouge also disbanded due to Vetter's pregnancy and marriage.

During the 1990s, Rose gained a deep interest in metaphysical naturalism. She even obtained a master's degree in USUI, kundalini and diamond Reiki. She is a licensed Tarot reader, Lifecoach, and Reiki Master. After about 17 years of living a private life in Frankfurt, Germany, she announced her intention to make a comeback of the Arabesque trio in December 2006, with 2 new members.

References

Living people
1958 births
English-language singers from Germany
German people of American descent
German people of Mexican descent
German dance musicians
German female models
German women pop singers
Musicians from Frankfurt
20th-century German women singers